This is a list of flag bearers who have represented Palau at the Olympics. Flag bearers carry the national flag of their country at the opening ceremony of the Olympic Games.

See also
Palau at the Olympics

References

Palau at the Olympics
Palau
Olympic flagbearers